Rhoicissus rhomboidea is a climbing plant in the family Vitaceae, commonly known as the glossy forest grape. It is found in the eastern forests of southern Africa. The species was first described in 1859, treated under Cissus.

References

Vitaceae
Flora of Southern Africa
Creepers of South Africa
Afromontane flora
Plants described in 1859